David Medina may refer to:

 David M. Medina (born 1958), justice of the Texas Supreme Court
 David Medina (footballer), Spanish footballer